The 2009 Peak Antifreeze & Motor Oil Indy 300 was the fifteenth round of the 2009 IndyCar Series season, and was held on August 29, 2009 at the  Chicagoland Speedway in Joliet, Illinois. The race was won by Ryan Briscoe who beat Scott Dixon on the last lap to win by only 0.0077 of a second.

Grid

Race

Standings after the race 

Drivers' Championship standings

References 

Peak Antifreeze Indy 300
Peak Antifreeze & Motor Oil Indy 300
Peak Antifreeze & Motor Oil Indy 300
Chicagoland Indy 300